Giselle Swart (born 17 August 1977) is a retired South African tennis player.

Swart won one singles title and three doubles titles on the ITF Circuit during her career. On 15 January 2001, she reached her best singles ranking of world No. 540. On 8 January 2001, she peaked at No. 454 in the doubles rankings.

In 1995, she played for South Africa in the 1995 African Games in Harare, Zimbabwe where she won the bronze medal in women's doubles.

ITF finals

Singles: 2 (1–1)

Doubles: 6 (3–3)

References

External links
 

1977 births
Living people
African Games bronze medalists for South Africa
African Games medalists in tennis
Competitors at the 1995 All-Africa Games
South African female tennis players